Kate Beavon (born 17 April 2000) is a South African swimmer. She competed in the women's 400 metre freestyle event at the 2017 World Aquatics Championships.

References

2000 births
Living people
South African female swimmers
Swimmers at the 2018 Commonwealth Games
Commonwealth Games competitors for South Africa
Place of birth missing (living people)
Swimmers at the 2018 Summer Youth Olympics
South African female freestyle swimmers
21st-century South African women